George Washington Hough (October 24, 1836 – January 1, 1909) was an American astronomer.

Biography
George Washington Hough was born in Tribes Hill, New York on October 24, 1836. He discovered 627 double stars and made systematic studies of the surface of Jupiter. He designed and constructed  several instruments used in astronomy, meteorology, and physics. From 1862 to 1874, Hough was director of Dudley Observatory, Albany, New York. In 1879 he was appointed professor of astronomy at the University of Chicago. He became the director of Dearborn Observatory when the observatory was moved to Evanston, Illinois. He introduced original plans for the dome and electric control for the telescope. He was elected to the American Philosophical Society in 1872.

He died at his home in Evanston on January 1, 1909.

References

External links
 Portrait of George W. Hough from the Lick Observatory Records Digital Archive, UC Santa Cruz Library's Digital Collections 

American astronomers
1836 births
1909 deaths
University of Chicago faculty
Northwestern University faculty
Union College (New York) alumni
People from Montgomery, New York
Scientists from New York (state)